The Alpine Space Programme is a transnational cooperation programme in the framework of the European Union cohesion policy. In this programme national, regional and local stakeholders from the participating countries in the Alpine space cooperate on various transnational projects.

Cooperation area 

Geographically the Alpine Space Programme cooperation area comprises the Alpine core area (in the sense of the Alpine Convention), the surrounding foothills and lowlands of the "peri-Alpine belt", a small part of the Mediterranean coastal area including the Adriatic and parts of the great river valleys of Danube, Po, Adige, Rhône and Rhine.

In the cooperation area live about 70 million inhabitants on a surface of approximately 450.000 km2. Several different European languages are spoken in this region, among others French, German, Italian and Slovene.

European policy framework 

The Alpine Space Programme 2007–2013 is part of the European Territorial Cooperation objective. The European Territorial Cooperation (ETC) has been developed from the Community Initiative INTERREG. INTERREG was created in the framework of the European Union's cohesion policy as an incentive for cooperation within the European Union. Cohesion policy encourages regions and cities from different EU Member States to work together and learn from each other through joint programmes, projects and networks. In the Structural Fund period 2007–2013 the Community Initiative INTERREG has been upgraded to the "European Territorial Cooperation Objective". In the current programme period 2007–13 the ETC objective covers three types of programmes: cross-border cooperation, transnational cooperation and interregional cooperation. The Alpine Space Programme is one of the 13 programmes of the transnational cooperation objective. The transnational programmes add an important extra European dimension to regional development, developed from analysis at a European level, leading to agreed priorities and a coordinated strategic response.

This allows meaningful work between regions from several EU Member States on matters such as communication corridors, flood management, international business and research linkages, and the development of more viable and sustainable markets.

The ETC is funded by the European Regional Development Fund (ERDF).

Three priorities 

The Alpine Space Programme identifies three thematic fields of cooperation, called priorities. With these priorities the programme supports the Lisbon and Gothenburg strategies towards growth, employment and sustainable development with a strong focus on the cross cutting theme innovation.

Priority 1: Competitiveness and attractiveness
One of the Alpine Space Programme's priorities in the funding period 2007–2013 is to enhance the attractiveness and competitiveness of the alpine region. Although the Alpine area is characterised by a rich and diversified economic structure with strong links to the territory and a well-developed polycentric urban system, low internal innovation capacities of SMEs, urban sprawl and depopulation reduce its competitiveness and attractiveness. In this context the challenge lies in strengthening the innovation capabilities of SMEs, in creating good environments for the development of SMEs and in fostering stable cooperation between R&TC centers and SMEs. Development options posed by traditional sectors and the cultural heritage are to be used more intensely.

Priority 2: Accessibility and connectivity
The second programme priority concerns accessibility and connectivity. The Alpine Space is both a centre of a dynamic economy and a transit area in a sensitive environment. At the same time it shows particular constraints in the fields of transport, communication and knowledge infrastructure. It faces natural constraints as regards accessibility and connectivity. The access to these public services however is crucial in order to meet the requirements of today's labour markets. For these reasons the Alpine Space Programme aims to secure and improve fair access to public services in the Alpine regions. With this priority the programme aims to improve the quality of transport of passengers and goods while mitigating the negative effects of traffic. Moreover, sustainable solutions should be found to help the local population to be better connected to wider networks. Therefore, the programme promotes joint actions which take into consideration integrated planning of transport and mobility, or ICT-based innovative public services for citizens and economy.

Priority 3: Environment and risk prevention
The third and final programme priority is environment and risk prevention. The Alpine space is known all over the world for its rich landscapes, cultural heritage and biodiversity. The natural environment and the natural heritage as a fundament for the living conditions and the economy therefore have to be protected. Integrated approaches to plan, manage and develop these resources can contribute to this. The programme therefore wants the operations under this priority to be focused on the management and safeguard of environmental resources and cultural heritage as well as on natural and technological hazards. Furthermore, the Alps are much earlier and more strongly affected by the climate change than the rest of Europe. Coping with the various effects of climate change and its related impacts on settlement, infrastructure, cultural heritage and human life is a key challenge for the Alpine Space.

Operation 

To maintain and enhance the competitiveness and attractiveness of the Alpine region the Alpine Space Programme co-finances transnational cooperation projects. The programme launches calls for project proposals, allowing potential project partnerships to apply for. For each call, Terms of References (ToR), containing framework information for the application are published. These ToRs and the launch of a new call are published on the programme's website. A project partnership has to consist of project partners coming from at least three different Partner States. Different types of actors can become project partners: public sector institutions and agencies at all levels; education and research units; organisations representing enterprises; chambers of commerce and industry; public service and transport providers; NGOs and agencies working in the fields of natural and cultural as well as renewable energy management.

Details and tools for potential project partners can be found on the Alpine Space Programme's website.

References

External links 
 Official Alpine Space Programme Website
 Official EU website on the European Territorial Cooperation Objective

Alps
European Union
Regional policies of the European Union
2007 in the European Union